Juan Ángel Krupoviesa (born 16 April 1979) is a retired Argentine footballer who played as a full back and current interim assistant coach of Boca Juniors.

Club career
Born in Tucumán, Krupoviesa had his professional debut with Estudiantes de La Plata, where he played from 1999 until 2005. In that same year, he moved to Boca Juniors. Krupoviesa won five titles in his first two years at Boca, but in October 2006 he suffered a serious injury that kept him out of the team for the remainder of the 2006–07 season.

In January 2008, he joined Marseille on loan, but he returned to Boca in July 2008.

With 31 years of age, Krupoviesa joined Arsenal de Sarandí on a free transfer for the beginning of the 2010–11 season.

Coaching career
In 2014, Kropoviesa re-joined his former club Estudiantes as a youth coach at the club.

In March 2018, it was reported that Krupoviesa would leave his position at Estudiantes in June 2018 to join Almagro as an assistant coach to Sebastián Battaglia. Failing to secure promotion on May 11, Battaglia was fired before Krupoviesa ever managed to take up his new role. Krupoviesa instead continued at Estudiantes, however, in a different role. He was appointed assistant coach to newly appointed first team manager at Estudiantes, Leandro Benítez, in June 2018. He left Estudiantes in February 2019.

In the beginning of 2020, Battaglia was appointed manager of Boca Juniors' reserve team, with Krupoviesa becoming his assistant.

Honours

References

External links
 Argentine Primera statistics
Statistics at Guardian Stats Centre

1979 births
Living people
Sportspeople from San Miguel de Tucumán
Association football fullbacks
Argentine footballers
Estudiantes de La Plata footballers
Boca Juniors footballers
Chacarita Juniors footballers
Olympique de Marseille players
Arsenal de Sarandí footballers
Argentine expatriate footballers
Argentine Primera División players
Ligue 1 players
Expatriate footballers in France
Argentine people of Polish descent
Argentine expatriate sportspeople in France